Viktória Oguntoye (born 24 December 1990) is a Slovak handball goalkeeper of Hungarian and Nigerian descent, who currently plays for Debreceni VSC. She also won several cups for the Hungarian junior national team. She acquired Hungarian citizenship and planned to play for the Hungarian nation team, but Viktória eventually represents Slovakia women's national team Slovakia women's national handball team in Qualification for 2020 European Women's Handball Championship 2020 European Women's Handball Championship.

Achievements
Nemzeti Bajnokság I:
Winner: 2008, 2009, 2010
Magyar Kupa:
Winner: 2008, 2009, 2010
EHF Champions League:
Finalist: 2009

References

External links
 Career statistics at Worldhandball

1990 births
Living people
Hungarian female handball players
Slovak female handball players
Hungarian people of Nigerian descent
Hungarian people of Yoruba descent
Hungarians in Slovakia
Yoruba sportswomen
Győri Audi ETO KC players
People from Nové Zámky District
Sportspeople from the Nitra Region